William Scott Ferguson (November 11, 1875 – April 28, 1954) was a Canadian-born classical scholar. He was the son of Senator Donald Ferguson. He was McLean Professor of Ancient and Modern History at Harvard University from 1929 to 1945. He was president of the American Historical Association in 1939.

References 
https://dbcs.rutgers.edu/all-scholars/8687-ferguson-william-scott
https://www.thecrimson.com/article/1945/5/1/ferguson-noted-historian-to-retire-at/

1875 births
1954 deaths
Canadian classical scholars
Classical scholars of Harvard University
Corresponding Fellows of the British Academy
Presidents of the American Historical Association
Canadian emigrants to the United States